The University of Illinois Chicago (UIC) is a public research university in Chicago, Illinois. Its campus is in the Near West Side community area, adjacent to the Chicago Loop. The second campus established under the University of Illinois system, UIC is also the largest university in the Chicago metropolitan area, having more than 33,000 students enrolled in 16 colleges. It is classified among "R1: Doctoral Universities – Very high research activity."

The roots of UIC can be traced to the establishment of the Chicago College of Pharmacy in 1859, which was joined in the 1800s by additional medical related schools. It began an undergraduate program toward the end of World War II, and developed its West side campus in the 1960s. In 1982, it consolidated the University of Illinois at Chicago Circle and the University of Illinois at the Medical Center into the present university. Today, the university has become a global leader for a number of subjects, such as nursing, pharmacy, communication, education, law, and public administration.

UIC competes in NCAA Division I Missouri Valley Conference. The Credit Union 1 Arena (formerly UIC Pavilion) is the Flames' venue for home basketball games.

History

Beginnings
The University of Illinois Chicago traces its origins to several private health colleges founded during the late 19th century, including the Chicago College of Pharmacy, which opened in 1859, the College of Physicians and Surgeons (1882), and the Columbian College of Dentistry (1893).

The University of Illinois was chartered in 1867 in Champaign-Urbana, as the state's land-grant university. In exchange for agreeing to the Champaign-Urbana location, Chicago-area legislators were promised that a "polytechnical" branch would open in Chicago. The Chicago-based health colleges affiliated with the university in 1896–97, becoming fully incorporated into the University of Illinois in 1913, as the Colleges of Medicine, Dentistry, and Pharmacy. Medical education and research expanded in the succeeding decades, leading to the development of several other health science colleges, which were brought together as the Chicago Professional Colleges. In 1935, the first act of newly elected state representative Richard J. Daley was to introduce a resolution calling for the establishment of an undergraduate Chicago campus of the University of Illinois.

Navy Pier campus
As World War II was drawing to a close, Congress passed the G.I. Bill in 1944, which sought to reward veterans for their military service. Among other benefits, it provided educational funding, making college degrees far more attainable to a much-wider selection of the American public. In 1945, Daley, who was then a state senator, introduced four bills calling for a university in Chicago. In 1946, realizing that they would be "besieged with applications," University of Illinois officials opened what was to be a temporary branch campus called the Chicago Undergraduate Division (CUD) on Navy Pier. The campus was not a junior college, but rather had a curriculum based on Urbana's courses, and students who successfully completed the first two years' requirements could go on to Urbana and finish their degree.

Classes at the CUD campus began in October 1946, and approximately 4,000 students enrolled each semester. Nicknamed "Harvard on the rocks," three-quarters of its students were veterans on the G.I. Bill, many of whom were immigrants and most of whom worked other part-time jobs to support themselves. It also accommodated first-generation college students from working families who commuted from home. (Navy Pier makes an appearance in Robert Pirsig's Zen and the Art of Motorcycle Maintenance; its protagonist taught freshman English there.)

Due to high demand for a public university education in Chicago, the university made plans to create a permanent degree-granting campus in Chicago. Students at CUD needed to transfer after two years to a more expensive private college in Chicago or go to the main campus in Champaign–Urbana, where there were fewer job opportunities.

Congress Circle campus
Daley succeeded in getting the state senate in 1951 to pass a bill calling for a Chicago campus. Daley then became mayor of Chicago in 1955 and pressed the University of Illinois to upgrade the Chicago Undergraduate Center to a full-fledged four-year institution. After a long and controversial site decision process, in 1961, Mayor Daley offered the Harrison and Halsted Streets site for the new campus. In December 1961, the final decision to establish a four-year university in Chicago was made. In that same year, the Chicago Professional Colleges became the University of Illinois at the Medical Center (UIMC).

Florence Scala led the fight against Mayor Richard J. Daley's plan to demolish her Italian-American neighborhood to construct the campus. In 1963, the trustees of Hull House accepted an offer of $875,000 for the settlement building. Jessie Binford and Scala took the case to the Supreme Court.  Scala led marches and staged a sit-in at City Hall to protest the construction. Lawsuits filed by her and others dogged Daley’s construction plans for almost two years. The struggle officially ended in 1963, when the U.S. Supreme Court declined to consider an appeal brought by neighborhood activists and the settlement was closed on March 28, 1963. During the construction of the 100-acre (0.40 km2) UIC campus, 200 businesses and 800 homes were bulldozed in Little Italy, with 5,000 residents displaced.	

In 1963, construction began on the university's new Chicago campus at Harrison and Halsted Streets near Greektown, Chicago. In February 1965, the new Chicago campus opened and was named the University of Illinois at Congress Circle (UICC) referencing the nearby Circle Interchange of I-290 and I-90/I-94). Shortly before opening, the Congress Expressway was renamed the Eisenhower Expressway and the campus was renamed to University of Illinois at Chicago Circle (UICC). UICC was designed in the brutalist style by Walter Netsch of Skidmore, Owings and Merrill, a Chicago-based architectural firm responsible for many of today's tallest skyscrapers. Unlike the CUD campus, Circle was a degree-granting institution. Within five years of the campus' opening, in addition to undergraduate degrees, virtually every department offered graduate degrees.

Consolidation
In September 1982, the University of Illinois system consolidated UICC and UIMC to form the University of Illinois at Chicago (UIC). In 2000, UIC began developing the south campus. The expansion of UIC south of Roosevelt Road increased on-campus living space and research facilities. In 2019, the John Marshall Law School (founded in 1899) became affiliated with the university.

Academics

One in ten Chicagoans with a college degree is a UIC alumnus. Approximately one in eight Illinois physicians is a graduate of the College of Medicine (the nation's largest medical school). One in three Illinois pharmacists is a graduate of the College of Pharmacy. Half of all the dentists in Illinois are graduates of the College of Dentistry.

Organization
The University of Illinois Chicago offers 86 bachelor's degrees, 111 master's degrees, and 66 doctoral degrees through its 16 colleges, in addition to the university's specialized Honors College (for undergraduates) and the omnibus Graduate College (for graduate students).

UIC offers eleven inter-college programs, some of which are organized as centers: Cancer Center, Center for Structural Biology, Neuroscience program, Council for Teacher Education, Graduate Education in Medical Sciences, Guaranteed Professional Programs Admissions program, Moving Image Arts program, National Center of Excellence in Women's Health, Office of International Affairs, Study Abroad Office, and the Office of Special Scholarship Programs.

The university is governed by the chancellor who is supported by seven vice chancellors, one CEO for administrative functions, and fifteen college deans. There is a library dean and three regional deans for colleges of medicine.

The Undergraduate Division was regarded as an offsite department of the main campus in Urbana-Champaign. As such, it was first headed by a dean (1946-1957), then an executive dean (1957-1960), then a vice president in charge (1960-1966) who reported to U of I's president. When the Chicago Circle campus, UIC's direct ancestor, opened in 1967, its chief executive was given the title of chancellor. At the same time, day-to-day leadership of the Urbana-Champaign campus was transferred to a chancellor as well, and both reported on an equal basis to the president.

Demographics

The student body at UIC consists of more than 30,000 total students, of which nearly 21,000 are undergraduate students. Demographic statistics for the student body  were:

The chancellor operates six diversity-related committees on Asian Americans, Blacks, Latinos, LGBT issues, persons with disabilities, and women. The University of Illinois Chicago is a federally designated Hispanic-serving institution (HSI) and is among the most ethnically diverse universities in the United States.

Rankings and statistics

Overall
In the 2022 U.S. News & World Report's ranking of colleges and universities, the University of Illinois Chicago ranked as the 97th best national university and the 52nd best national public university. In the 2018 Washington Monthly ranking of national universities, UIC ranked as the 26th best national university in the U.S. In 2014–15, Academic Ranking of World Universities placed UIC in the 150–200 bracket in the world and 68–85 in the U.S. In 2016–17, the Times Higher Education World University Rankings placed UIC 63rd in the U.S. and 200th in the world. In 2014, Times Higher Education 100 Under 50 University Rankings (a comparison of universities less than 50 years old) placed UIC in the 3rd position in the U.S. and 13th in the world. The 2014/15 QS Worldwide University rankings placed UIC in the 186th position. Forbes ranked the University of Illinois Chicago 361st out of 650 universities in "America's Top Colleges 2014".

Research
UIC is classified among "R1: Doctoral Universities – Very high research activity." According to the National Science Foundation, UIC spent $361 million on research and development in 2018, ranking it 69th in the nation.

Subject areas – program-specific
In the 2012 rankings by the Institute of Higher Education in Shanghai, UIC tied for 51st–75th in the subject area of social sciences, 76th–100th in the subject area of medicine, and 101st–150th in the subject areas of life/agricultural sciences and natural sciences and mathematics.

In U.S. News & World Report's 2015 rankings, published in 2014, the University of Illinois Chicago Liautaud Graduate School of Business was ranked 92nd for among best business schools for its full-time MBA program.

Many programs ranked in the top 50 overall graduate program rankings by U.S. News & World Report in 2013 (released in 2012) including: Clinical Psychology (42) Criminology (19), Education (38), English (41), Fine Arts (45), History (36), Mathematics (36), Nursing (11), Occupational Therapy (4), Pharmacy (14), Physical Therapy (16), Public Affairs (37), Public Health (16), Social Work (24), and Sociology (41). The June 2007 issue of the Communications of Association for Computing Machinery published a ranking of graduate computer science programs based on recent scholarly publications. That list ranked UIC 34th, tied with Caltech, among the top 50 U.S. graduate programs.

The Princeton Review and Entrepreneur magazine's survey of more than 700 American schools ranked UIC's entrepreneurship program 9th (undergraduate) and 12th (graduate). In 2008 U.S. News & World Report ranked UIC's undergraduate business program 58th and the undergraduate engineering program 57th in the United States. U.S. News & World Report also ranked UIC's part-time MBA 24th out of over 300 programs nationally and the graduate finance program 19th; undergraduate program rankings were accounting (28th) and finance (17th in 2010). In 2010 Princeton Review ranked UIC in the top 50 undergraduate game design programs of 700 universities in the US and Canada. Criteria included the quality of the curriculum, faculty, facilities and infrastructure. The Princeton Review also looked at data on scholarships, financial aid and career opportunities.

UIC merged with the John Marshall Law School in 2019 and formally became the UIC John Marshall Law School. It is the first public law school in the city of Chicago and an addition long overdue for the university striving to broaden the availability of a public law school in the city. John Marshall students officially became UIC students and are entitled to the accessibility to the same resources as all UIC Students.

In May 2021, the UI Trustees voted to officially rename UIC John Marshall Law School as UIC School of Law in July 2021, citing John Marshall's “role as a slave trader, slave owner of hundreds of slaves, pro-slavery jurisprudence, and racist views”.

Campus
UIC is Chicago's largest university with more than 33,000 students, 12,000 employees, 16 colleges and the state's major public medical center.

The East Campus was designed in the brutalist style by Walter Netsch. The plan included second-story walkways that connected all of the buildings. Some of the later buildings in Netsch's design were not rectilinear (the Behavioral Sciences Building) and even irregularly shaped (Science and Engineering South, and the never-completed Art & Architecture building). These demonstrated his idea of "field theory": designs which used squares and rotations of squares superimposed on one another. While the buildings are largely intact, the walkways were taken down in phases during the early 1990s to make the campus more welcoming. Considerable effort has been expended to modify the original Netsch campus plan to create the feel of a traditional college campus. For example, the area in front of the main administration building, University Hall, has been the site of several renovations in the last decade; and, Credit Union 1 Arena (formerly the UIC Pavilion, a sports arena) was added in 1982.

The East Campus is located on the Near West Side, just south of Greektown and a 15-minute walk from downtown Chicago. The juxtaposition of campus and commercial density was a direct result of large-scale urban renewal led by Mayor Richard J. Daley.

The West Campus, also on the Near West Side, is much older and includes some buildings built in the collegiate gothic style. The colleges of Medicine, Pharmacy, Nursing, Dentistry, Applied Health Sciences and Public Health, as well as the Library of the Health Sciences are all located on the West Campus. The West Campus is in the heart of the Illinois Medical District where the University of Illinois Medical Center is located.

The Chicago Transit Authority's Blue Line, part of the Chicago 'L', runs through the median of the Eisenhower Expressway along the north side of the campus. Three Blue Line stations are close to the university: UIC-Halsted, Racine, and Illinois Medical District. The Pink Line serves UIC's west campus on Polk Street and runs directly to Ogilvie Transportation Center.

Student housing

UIC offers nine residence halls for its students. The East Campus contains four residence halls, the South Campus contains three, and the West Campus contains three. Until the South Campus expansion, UIC students were still predominantly commuters. However, the administration has worked to change the campus to one where most students are residential. Nearly 6,000 students live within one-and-a-half miles of campus. 3,800 students, including over half of all freshmen, live in UIC's nine residence halls. There are also thousands of apartments within walking distance to classes.

On the East Campus, Commons West and Commons South are traditional halls with double rooms opening into a common hallway; each floor shares a common bathroom. Courtyard and Commons North are cluster-style buildings with rooms grouped to share a small private bathroom. These four buildings are connected to the Student Center East which houses a cafeteria, the campus bookstore, a convenience store, bowling/billiards, a barber shop, and the Inner Circle (an assortment of fast food restaurants).

West Campus housing is composed of the Single Student Residence (SSR, apartments for graduate students) and Polk Street Residence (cluster style rooms). South Campus is home to Marie Robinson Hall and Thomas Beckham Hall, both apartment style buildings. In the fall of 2007, James Stukel Towers opened containing suite style rooms with a bathroom and living room. In keeping with UIC culture, students often refer to residence halls by abbreviations instead of their full names (e.g. "TBH" instead of "Thomas Beckham Hall").

The main purpose of the SSR is to house graduate students, undergraduate students of the ages 24 and older, and professional students. The third and fourth floors house undergraduate students of the ages of 21 through 23. The nursing house is located on the 16th floor. The fifth floor of the SSR has a pilot program for students with families. The program can house up to 15 families. Residents of the family program are zoned to Chicago Public Schools. Families living in the SSR are assigned to Washington Irving Elementary School and Crane High School.

The brand new Academic and Residential Complex, ARC, was opened in response to the ongoing enrollment increase at the university. The building consists of large lecture halls, smaller discussion section classrooms, meeting rooms, and student housing. The building also has a small gym for student occupants and a Starbucks.

Student recreation
The UIC Student Recreation Facility (SRF) is a recreational complex for UIC students. Opened in spring 2006, the SRF features a three-story climbing wall, multipurpose courts for games, and a pool with adjoining lazy river. There is also a recreational facility on the west side of the campus. The Sport and Fitness Center, SFC, comprises a fitness floor, Olympic pool, steam room, multipurpose courts, and racquetball courts. UIC Campus Recreation also oversees the Outdoor Field Complex, OFC, on the south side of campus. This outdoor complex comprises two large multipurpose fields. Campus Recreation hosts a variety of programs that promotes the wellness and well-being of students throughout the academic year. Such events includes RecFest, Destress fest, and many more.

Medical center and College of Medicine

The University of Illinois College of Medicine offers a four-year program leading to the MD degree at four different sites in Illinois: Chicago, Peoria, Rockford, and Urbana-Champaign. UIC is a major part of the Illinois Medical District (IMD). While IMD's billing itself "the nation's largest urban medical district" may be up for debate, the district is a major economic force contributing $3.3 billion to the local economy and supporting 50,000 jobs. In popular culture, UIC College of Medicine was the Medical School affiliated with Cook County Hospital in the television series E.R.

Campus renovations

After the major $550 million South Campus expansion, the university began renovating existing facilities on campus. This focus is in part due to a constrained state budget: state funds for new buildings are scarce. Since renovation is less costly, this approach is being used to update facilities.

The first such renovations were to three original "pillbox" buildings: Grant Hall, Lincoln Hall, and Douglas Hall. The renovated buildings use solar and geothermal power which required digging fifty wells 500 feet into the ground east of University Hall. The energy savings of 20–25% led to Lincoln Hall and Douglas Hall being certified US LEED Gold. Grant Hall did not apply for LEED certification even though it was the prototype for many of the features found on Lincoln and Douglas Halls.
 The new fascia are all glass and the buildings contain facilities for faculty and students. There are plans to expand the renovation project to every lecture hall cluster if the pilot program is successful.

Other campus renovations include the roof of the Behavioral Sciences Building and the terrace of the Education, Performing Arts, and Social Work building. A brand new building housing the College of Engineering was opened in 2019 to accommodate the increased enrollment in the college. It features the only high bay structural laboratory in the city of Chicago.

To accommodate the rising enrollment in the computer science department, a new building is being constructed called the Computer Design Research and Learning Center (CDRLC); it is slated to be completed in the summer of 2023, with a budget of $117.8 million.

Sustainability
The university's Office of Sustainability was founded in January 2008.
Current sustainability initiatives include lighting upgrades, building envelope improvements, metering upgrades, and landscape waste composting. Recent work on Grant, Lincoln, and Douglas Halls included upgrading them to use geothermal heat pumps, which efficiently heat and cool the building. The university has approved a Climate Action Plan.

Athletics

The Illinois–Chicago (UIC) athletic teams are called the Flames. The university is a member of the Division I level of the National Collegiate Athletic Association (NCAA), primarily competing in the Missouri Valley Conference (MVC) since the 2022–23 academic year. The Flames previously competed in the D-I Horizon League from 1994–95 to 2021–22; in the D-I Mid-Continent Conference (Mid-Con, now currently known as the Summit League since the 2007–08 school year) from 1982–83 to 1993–94; as an NCAA D-I Independent during the 1981–82 school year; and in the Chicagoland Collegiate Athletic Conference (CCAC) of the National Association of Intercollegiate Athletics (NAIA) from 1949–50 to about 1980–81.

UIC competes in 18 intercollegiate varsity sports: Men's sports include baseball, basketball, cross country, soccer, swimming & diving, tennis and track & field (indoor and outdoor); while women's sports include basketball, cross country, golf, soccer, softball, swimming & diving, tennis, track & field (indoor and outdoor) and volleyball.

Nickname
UIC's team name is the Flames, a reference to the Great Chicago Fire which started a few blocks east of campus. The mascot is Sparky D. Dragon.

Men's soccer
In September 2006, the men's soccer team earned its highest ranking in school history when the SoccerTimes.com College Coaches Poll pegged the Flames at No. 6 in the country. In November 2006, UIC defeated Western Illinois 3–0 in the opening round of the NCAA tournament before falling in the second round to Notre Dame 1–0. UIC finished the 2006 season as the nation's best defensive squad after allowing a mere eight goals in over 1993 minutes of play during 21 matches for a goals-against average (GAA) of 0.36. The GAA was tops in the nation in 2006 and it also ranked fifth all-time in NCAA history. UIC posted 13 shutouts and never allowed more than a single goal in a match. UIC also allowed just two goals after intermission the entire season. Along with the GAA mark, UIC posted the nation's best save percentage with a 0.908 rate.

In 2007, UIC soccer's successful season culminated in an Elite-Eight appearance in the NCAA tournament by way of wins over No. 12 St. Louis, Northwestern, and No. 8 Creighton. In a bid for a Final-Four appearance, UIC fell to Massachusetts 2–1. At season's end, UIC had a record of 13–6–6 and was named a top 10 team by the National Soccer Coaches Association of America (NSCAA).

Baseball
UIC's baseball team recorded 30 or more victories in a nine-year stretch from 2001 to 2010, won seven straight Horizon League Championships, and advanced to an NCAA regional four times (2003, 2005, 2007, 2008). UIC baseball has recorded regional wins against No. 1 Long Beach State in 2007 and No. 2 Dallas Baptist University in 2008.

Gymnastics
In 1978 and 1979 the UIC men's gymnastics team won the school's only NCAA team titles at the Division II Championships. Following the 1979 season the men's gymnastics program entered Division I competition and finished the season ranked 10th, Nationally. After the successful 1980 season the remainder of the UIC athletic teams ascended to Division I status. The 1996 men's gymnastics team finished the season in 9th place, the school's highest final ranking. UIC Men's Gymnastics individual Division I All America honorees include: Paul Fina (Rings), Mike Costa (Pommel Horse, twice), Barry McDonald (Parallel Bars), Shannon Welker (Floor Exercise), Neil Faustino (Vault), and Andrew Stover (Horizontal Bar).

Student life

The university is located near the neighborhoods of Taylor Street, Greektown and Pilsen, with restaurants, and bars nearby. Downtown Chicago is a 10-minute walk or a short CTA ride away.

UIC has a wide variety of amenities in its Student Centers. There are two on campus, one on the east side and one on the west side. Student Center East, SCE, is the hub to all student life on the east side of campus. The three story building comprises the following amenities and services:

UIC Student Center West, SCW, also consists of various amenities to the students on the west side of campus, while smaller their services include:

UIC has 200 student organizations, sports clubs, volunteer groups, Greek fraternities and sororities, and other associations, which include:

UIC's monthly/weekly events:
 Friday Night Live

UIC's once-a-semester/year events:

Spark in the Park
Spark in the Park is an annual music festival that is held on Harrison field, off Halsted and Harrison, except in 2014 and 2015, when it was held in the UIC Pavilion due to construction on the Eisehower Expressway Interstate 290. It is held during the second week of classes in the fall. The first year it was held was in 2010 where Kid Cudi was the headliner, followed by Lupe Fiasco in 2011, Childish Gambino in 2012, Kendrick Lamar in 2013, and J. Cole in 2014. In 2015 Twenty One Pilots were the headliners and also featured Wale. In 2016, rapper Young Thug was the opening act followed by a performance by both Daya and Travis Scott. In 2017, Nick Jonas performed along with DRAM. In 2018 rapper Rich The Kid headlined the show, and in 2019 21 Savage performed at the event.

Greek life
Greek letter social organizations at the University of Illinois Chicago create smaller communities within the larger University environment for the purposes of facilitating growth in the areas of scholarship, personal and leadership development, campus involvement and community service. The creeds and rituals that guide the individual organizations are based on values and ethics that foster the highest ideals and behavior.

Fraternal organizations have been a core component of the campus community since the 1970s. Currently there are 27 social fraternities and sororities, including both general and culturally based organizations.

Fraternities

 Alpha Epsilon Pi
 Alpha Phi Alpha
 Chi Sigma Tau
 Delta Epsilon Psi
 Iota Phi Theta
 Kappa Pi Beta
 Lambda Theta Phi
 Lambda Sigma Upsilon
 Omega Delta
 Omega Delta Phi
 Phi Beta Sigma
 Phi Kappa Psi
 Sigma Alpha Mu
 Sigma Lambda Beta
 Tau Kappa Beta
 Tau Phi Sigma
 Theta Lambda Beta
 Theta Xi

Sororities

 Alpha Kappa Alpha
 alpha Kappa Delta Phi
 Alpha Phi Gamma
 Alpha Sigma Tau
 Chi Sigma Omega
 Delta Kappa Delta
 Delta Phi Epsilon
 Delta Phi Omega
 Delta Xi Phi
 Gamma Phi Omega
 Lambda Zeta Chi
 Lambda Theta Alpha
 Phi Sigma Sigma
 Sigma Gamma Rho
 Sigma Lambda Gamma

Co-ed fraternities
 Alpha Psi Lambda
 Alpha Phi Omega
 Omega Phi Alpha Psi
 Alpha Kappa Psi
 Delta Psi Alpha
 Delta Epsilon Mu

Student media
 234 Magazine – Student-run Art and Culture publication
 Chicago Flame (Pier Illini/Chicago Illini) – A former independent weekly newspaper
 the Argus – A former independent weekly newspaper and media site
 UIC Radio – An internet based radio station
 Red Shoes Review – A review literary and art magazine
 Journal for Pre-Health Affiliated Students (JPHAS)- A student-run medical journal
 UIC ONEWORLD – A journal focusing on social justice issues
 UIC Today – A former daily newspaper
 Housing Cable – TV closed-circuit cable station
 UIC Portfolio Management Team - Investment Management

Notable alumni and faculty

See also 

 CASTp

References

External links
 
 
 Official athletics website

 
Universities and colleges in Chicago
West Side, Chicago
Educational institutions established in 1859
1859 establishments in Illinois
Public universities and colleges in Illinois
Chicago